Northeast College of Health Sciences is a private alternative health college in Seneca Falls, New York. It has graduate programs in areas such as chiropractic, health sciences and education. It was previously named Columbia Institute of Chiropractic and New York Chiropractic College before being renamed in 2021. It is one of 18 chiropractic colleges in the United States.

History
The school was founded in New York City as Columbia Institute of Chiropractic by chiropractor Frank Dean in 1919. In 1977, the New York State Board of Regents recognized the college under the name New York Chiropractic College before moving from Manhattan to Long Island three years later. In 1989, unable to expand in Long Island, Northeast purchased the former Eisenhower College campus in Seneca Falls, New York. After two years of renovations the college moved to the Seneca Falls campus in 1991.

Northeast formerly had a partnership with the addiction treatment program Bridge Back to Life, founded by neurologist and addiction medicine specialist Russell Surasky.

On June 7, 2021, the college changed its name from New York Chiropractic College to Northeast College of Health Sciences to better reflect its various masters and doctor awarding programs.

Academics
In addition to a D.C. program, the college offers programs in clinical nutrition, diagnostic imaging, anatomy, and human anatomy & physiology instruction.

The college also runs three community clinics in Seneca Falls, Depew, and Levittown, New York. The school is affiliated with the National Naval Medical Center in Bethesda, Maryland and Veterans Hospitals in Syracuse, New York, Buffalo, New York, Canandaigua, New York, Bath, New York, and Miami, Florida.

Notable alumni

 Paul Frame, American ballet dancer
 Karyn Marshall, Olympic weightlifter and Doctor of Chiropractic in New Jersey
 Ora Golan, Founder of The Ora Golan Center for Functional Medicine 
 John Napier (bobsleigh), American bobsled driver

References

External links
 Official website

Chiropractic schools in the United States
Private universities and colleges in New York (state)
Educational institutions established in 1919
1919 establishments in New York (state)
Education in Seneca County, New York